By the Light of the Moon is a novel by the best-selling author Dean Koontz, released in 2002.

Synopsis
An amoral doctor forever changes the lives of Dylan O'Conner, his autistic brother Shepherd, and a comedian named Jillian Jackson, and instigates a new force for good from his evil acts.

Plot

Dylan O'Conner is traveling with his 20-year-old brother Shep. During a stay at an Arizona motel, he is knocked out and tied up by a doctor, who administers 18 cc's of a golden substance from a syringe with a large-bore hypodermic needle. He informs Dylan that it may have unexpected effects.

Jillian Jackson, a traveling comedian, is tied up and chloroformed by the doctor before being injected with the same substance.

The two meet after escaping their bonds, just as a large number of SUV's arrive. A brief meeting fight ensues before they escape.

While traveling, they are overcome with the urge to do the right thing. Dylan becomes psychometric and Shep reveals an ability to travel from one place to another, referred to as 'folding'. Eventually, they come to share each other's abilities.

Topics

The novel deals with the topics of the ethical uses of nanotechnology, the urge to act rightly and biological hardwiring.

References

External links
By the Light of the Moon Book Review

2002 American novels
Novels by Dean Koontz
American thriller novels

Novels set in Arizona